The Treaty of Den Haag (also known as the Treaty of The Hague and occasionally the Hedges Treaty) was signed on May 16, 1795 between representatives of the French Republic and the Batavian Republic. Based on the terms of the treaty, the Batavian Republic ceded to France the territories of Maastricht, Venlo, and Zeelandic Flanders. Moreover, the accord established a defensive alliance between the two nations, which rapidly involved the Netherlands in the war against Great Britain and Austria. Furthermore, the Dutch agreed to pay an indemnity of 100 million guilders for their part in the war of the First Coalition, and to provide the French Republic a large loan against a low rate of interest. The "barrier forts"  in the former Austrian Netherlands were dismantled. The port of Flushing was to be placed under a co-dominion. Finally, in a secret clause, the Dutch agreed to pay for a French army of occupation of 25,000 till the war was ended.

References

Further reading
 (1977), Patriots and Liberators. Revolution in the Netherlands 1780-1813, New York, Vintage books, 
 "Much in Little: The Dutch Revolution of 1795." The Journal of Modern History, Vol. 26, No. 1  (March 1954), pp. 15–35.

See also
List of treaties

External links
The Batavian Republic, 1795-1806

1795 treaties
Treaty of the Hague
Treaty of the Hague
Treaties of the French First Republic
Treaties of the Batavian Republic
18th century in The Hague